Yoon Yoo-sun (born January 17, 1969) is a famous South Korean actress. She began her career as a child actress in 1975, and continues to be active in film and television, notably in The Story of Two Women (1994), Even If the Wind Blows (1995), High Kick: Revenge of the Short Legged (2011) and Another Promise (2014).

Philanthropy 
On February 16, 2023, Yoon donated 30 million won to help 2023 Turkey–Syria earthquake, by donating money through World Vision.

Filmography

Film

Television series

Web series

Variety shows

Radio shows

Theater

Awards and nominations

References

External links 
 Yoon Yoo-sun Fan Cafe at Daum 
 
 
 
 

1969 births
Living people
People from Seoul
Actresses from Seoul
South Korean television actresses
South Korean film actresses
South Korean stage actresses
South Korean musical theatre actresses
South Korean child actresses
Seoul Institute of the Arts alumni